South Coast United Soccer Club (formerly known as South Coast Croatia Soccer Club) is a semi-professional Australian soccer club from the city of Wollongong, New South Wales. The club was founded in 1984 by Wollongong's Croatian Australian community. The club plays in the Illawarra Premier League.

History 
Founded in 1984 by Croatian migrants as South Coast Croatia Soccer Club, the high point in the club's history came in 1987 when the club won its only Illawarra Premier League

South Coast Croatia were forced to change their name to South Coast United for the 1994 season a very unpopular move by Soccer Australia but with the end of NCIP some of the supporters want their club to return to its original name.

South Coast United were previously in the Illawarra Conference League, or Division 1 as it was previously known. In 2004, United were minor premiers of the Illawarra Conference League, and gained promotion to the Illawarra Premier League, but lost the Grand Final to Helensburgh 4–1.

South Coast United known as (Wollongong Croatia) is a regular participant of the Australian-Croatian Soccer Tournament although never having won the tournament in Division 1 the club has won Division 2 and Masters Titles with the most recent examples being 2011 at Edensor Park and 2014 at Ian Mclennan Park, respectively.

The club hosted the Australian-Croatian Soccer Tournament in 1994 and 2014

South Coast United formed a junior club under their name and were brought into the FSC junior football competition in 2016.

Rivalries

Albion Park White Eagles 
The club has maintained a heated rivalry with the predominantly Serbian backed Albion Park White Eagles/Wollongong Serbia the clubs rivalry dates back to 1985 when Wollongong Serbia were founded with the rivalry based around political tensions between the two nationalities, breakout of the Croatian War of Independence in the 1990's added more fuel to the flame for players and supporters alike.

Cringila Lions 
South Coast United/Croatia have always had a friendly rivalry with the Macedonian backed Cringila Lions FC as both clubs used to be powerhouses in the Illawarra Premier League over the years many players have swapped between the clubs including Zvonko Usljebrka and Brian & Tom Butkovic

Supporters 
The club has a predominantly Croatian Australian fan base as the club was founded by Croatian migrants.

Achievements

Home ground 
South Coast United have played out of Ian McLennan Park since their inception in 1984. For a majority of the 2018 season, United played out of Dandaloo Oval due to the redevelopment of Ian McLennan Park which included the laying of a synthetic pitch. South Coast United now have the best facilities in the Illawarra region with the only synthetic field in the area.

Notable former players

Divisional history

See also 
 List of Croatian soccer clubs in Australia
 Australian-Croatian Soccer Tournament

References 

Croatian sports clubs in Australia
Soccer clubs in Wollongong
Illawarra Premier League
1984 establishments in Australia
Association football clubs established in 1984
South Coast (New South Wales)